The Quseir Formation is a geological formation in the vicinity of the Kharga Oasis in Egypt. It is Campanian In age. The lithology largely consists of soft shale with hard bands of sandstone, siltstone and phosphorite. The environment of deposition was nearshore to freshwater fluvio-lacustrine characterized by moist and aquatic habitats with a tropical warm-humid climate. It is conformably overlain by the marine late Campanian-Maastrichtian Duwi Formation, and unconformably overlies the Turonian Taref Formation. The sauropod dinosaur Mansourasaurus is known from the formation, as well as the proximal fibula of an indeterminate theropod. Additionally the lungfish genera Lavocatodus and Protopterus, the crocodyliform Wahasuchus and the bothremydid turtle Khargachelys are also known.

References 

Geologic formations of Egypt
Upper Cretaceous Series of Africa
Campanian Stage
Shale formations
Siltstone formations
Deltaic deposits
Fluvial deposits
Fossiliferous stratigraphic units of Africa
Paleontology in Egypt